"Far l'amore" is a song by French music producer and DJ Bob Sinclar, with vocals by Italian singer Raffaella Carrà, sampled from her 1976 hit "A far l'amore comincia tu". It was released on 17 March 2011 and peaked at number 6 in Italy.

Music video
The accompanied video featured Sinclar and his date, actress/model Caterina Murino, preparing to go to his own party in Milan, Italy. They are detoured by a taxi driver who they just hailed after learning that he is not from Milan and uses a map of the city to find the directions, leading Caterina to argue with him. At the same time, everyone who just showed up for the party, including Raffaella Carrà herself, are wondering where is Sinclar and if he'll show up for his own event. After the song ends, Sinclar and Murino finally show up but everyone has since left; the two decide to spend time around Milan together.

Track listings and formats
Digital download
"Far l'amore" (Radio Edit) – 3:02
"Far l'amore" (Club Mix) – 6:24

CD remixes – Energy Italy (XR 12352.11CDS)
 "Far l'amore" (Radio Edit) – 3:02 	
 "Far l'amore" (Club Mix) – 6:25 	
 "Far l'amore" (Rudeejay Remix) – 5:38 	
 "Far l'amore" (Nari & Milani Remix) – 6:04 	
 "Far l'amore" (Michael Calfan Remix) – 5:32 	
 "Far l'amore" (Stefano Pain vs. Marcel Booty Remix) – 5:54 	
 "Far l'amore" (Bryan Le Grand Ibiza Mix) – 6:03 	
 "Far l'amore" (Federico Scavo & NDKJ Remix) – 5:20

Credits and personnel
Bob Sinclar – producer, keyboards, arrangement, instrumentation, recording and mixing
Raffaella Carrà – vocal, songwriter

Charts and certifications

Weekly charts

Year-end Charts

Certifications

See also
2011 in music
List of top 100 singles of 2011 (France)

References

Bob Sinclar songs
2011 singles
2011 songs
Songs written by Bob Sinclar
Raffaella Carrà songs